The year 2022 began with several United States cannabis reform proposals pre-filed in 2021 for the upcoming year's legislative session. Among the remaining prohibitionist states, legalization of adult use in Delaware and Oklahoma was considered most likely, and Maryland, Ohio, Pennsylvania and Rhode Island somewhat less likely; medical cannabis in Mississippi was called likely at the beginning of 2022. At the federal level, "a lack of consensus on the legislative strategy" shown in competing bills with both comprehensive and incremental approaches was said by a lobbyist at the beginning of the year to be "stunting the legalization effort". The likely approaches to legalization were reflected by the Marijuana Opportunity Reinvestment and Expungement Act (MORE), the Cannabis Administration and Opportunity Act (CAOA) and the States Reform Act (SRA), and the more modest less-than-legalization SAFE Banking Act, considered "the least controversial of all the cannabis-reform bills" with "substantial bipartisan appeal".

Legislation and initiatives introduced in 2021 for 2022 sessions

State

Federal

Legislation and initiatives introduced in 2022

State, territory, or district

Federal

Legislation introduced earlier and advanced in 2022

State

Executive and judicial actions

The governor of Kentucky, Andy Beshear, said on April 7 that he was considering executive action to permit medical cannabis in his state if House Bill 136 was not approved in the state senate. When the session ended without senate consideration of the bill, Beshear issued an executive order that created a committee to provide recommendations on ways forward for medical cannabis.

The governor of Pennsylvania Tom Wolf and lieutenant governor John Fetterman announced a mass pardon program for past nonviolent cannabis offenses on September 1.

The Massachusetts Supreme Judicial Court found in September that requests for expungement of past cannabis offenses, including possession prior to 2018 legalization, are entitled to a "strong presumption in favor" of approval.

President Biden announced a mass pardon for past federal cannabis possession convictions on October 6 and ordered Attorney General Merrick Garland to begin studying reclassifying or descheduling cannabis under the Controlled Substances Act.

Governor of Oregon Kate Brown issued a mass pardon on November 21 for 45,000 persons convicted of simple possession.

References

Further reading

Cannabis in 2022, Wikileaf, December 30, 2021

External links
Marijuana on the ballot at Ballotpedia

Cannabis reform proposals 2022
Cannabis reform 2022

2022 United States
Reform proposals 2022